Delwyn Rudy Young (born June 30, 1982) is an American former professional baseball utility player. He played in Major League Baseball (MLB) for the Los Angeles Dodgers and Pittsburgh Pirates. He is currently the manager of the State College Spikes of the MLB Draft League.

High school years
Young attended Littlerock High School in Littlerock, California where he was a student and a four-year letterwinner in baseball. Delwyn graduated in 2000.

College years and draft
Young attended Santa Barbara City College under coach Teddy Warrecker where he still holds the team records for hits, runs, home runs and RBIs.

Young was drafted twice by the Atlanta Braves in 2000 (31st round) and 2001 (29th round), but did not sign as he preferred to remain in college.

Professional career

Los Angeles Dodgers
Young was drafted by the Los Angeles Dodgers in the 4th round of the 2002 MLB draft and signed with them on June 12, 2002.
After hitting well in the Dodger rookie leagues in 2002 (.300) & 2003 (.323), Young played for the Vero Beach Dodgers in 2004, hitting .281 with 22 HRs, 85 RBIs, and 11 SBs earning Baseball America's second team Minor League All-Star honors as well as being a Florida State League All-Star at second base. In 2005, with the Double-A Jacksonville Suns he hit .296 with 16 HRs and 62 RBIs, leading to his promotion to the Triple-A Las Vegas 51s. He hit .325 with the 51s in 36 games the remainder of the season. While he was with the 51s, the organization decided to change his position, moving him from second base to the outfield. He spent the entire 2006 season with the 51s, hitting .273 with 18 HRs and 98 RBIs, though he had a high strikeout total with 104 strikeouts.

Young made his MLB debut with the Dodgers on September 7, 2006 against the New York Mets at Shea Stadium. He went hitless in one at bat. He appeared in eight games for the Dodgers in September, going hitless in five at bats as a pinch hitter. On August 3, 2007, Young made his first career start with the Los Angeles Dodgers. He recorded his first hit as a pinch hitter on August 4 against the Arizona Diamondbacks. On August 9, in his second career start, he went 4 for 4 against the Cincinnati Reds. He hit his first major league home run on September 25, off Colorado Rockies' Manny Corpas.  A couple days later he hit another one off San Francisco Giants' Barry Zito.

On April 1, 2008, Young hit his first career walk-off single against San Francisco Giants pitcher Keiichi Yabu. He battled injuries the rest of the season, and had to undergo off-season surgery on his elbow  Young's attempt to rejoin the Dodgers roster for 2009 was derailed when he suffered another minor injury in spring training and he began the season on the disabled list. He was eventually traded on April 14 to the Pittsburgh Pirates for two players to be named later. The Pirates sent Eric Krebs to the Dodgers on May 22, 2009, and they sent Harvey García to the Dodgers on August 1, 2009, to complete the trade.

Pittsburgh Pirates
Although mostly an outfielder, Young began working with Pirates coach Perry Hill on playing second base, a position he played in the minor leagues and occasionally with the Dodgers. He finished 2009 with 16 doubles, 2 triples, 7 home runs, 43 runs batted in, 2 stolen bases, to go along with a .266 average, a .326 on-base percentage, a .381 slugging percentage, in 354 at bats. Delwyn Young made the Pirates Opening Day roster out of spring training as a bench player in 2010. On June 8, he hit a two-run homer against Stephen Strasburg during Strasburg's first start as a big league pitcher. He was granted free agency on November 2.

Philadelphia Phillies
On January 6, 2011, the Philadelphia Phillies announced that Young had signed a minor league contract, with an invitation to spring training. He played the entire 2011 season with the Phillies top farm team, the Lehigh Valley IronPigs. He became a free agent again at the end of the season.

Chicago White Sox
Young signed a minor league contract with the Chicago White Sox on January 23, 2012. However, after not making the club out of spring training, he was released in March.

Camden Riversharks
Young signed with the Camden Riversharks on July 26, 2012.

Washington Nationals
Young signed a minor league contract with the Washington Nationals on January 14, 2013. Young was released in March 2013.

Sugar Land Skeeters
Young signed with the Sugar Land Skeeters of the Atlantic League of Professional Baseball for the 2014 season. He became a free agent after the 2016 season.

Personal life
Young's father, Delwyn Young, Sr., was drafted in 1981 by the Cincinnati Reds out of Belmont High School in Los Angeles. He played 11 seasons with five different organizations.

Coaching career
Young has previously served as the hitting coach for the rookie level Kingsport Mets in 2018 and the Short-Season A Brooklyn Cyclones in 2019, both minor league affiliates of the New York Mets. On April 12, 2021, Young was announced as the manager of the State College Spikes for the inaugural season of the MLB Draft League. Young also is an instructor for the Sugar Land Skeeters of the Atlantic League of Professional Baseball. On January 18, 2022, Young was named the hitting coach for the Wilmington Blue Rocks, the High-A minor league affiliate of the Washington Nationals.

References

External links

1982 births
Living people
African-American baseball coaches
African-American baseball players
Albuquerque Isotopes players
American expatriate baseball players in Mexico
Baseball coaches from California
Baseball players from California
Brooklyn Cyclones coaches
Camden Riversharks players
Cardenales de Lara players
American expatriate baseball players in Venezuela
Great Falls Dodgers players
Jacksonville Suns players
Las Vegas 51s players
Lehigh Valley IronPigs players
Los Angeles Dodgers players
Major League Baseball left fielders
Major League Baseball right fielders
Major League Baseball second basemen
Mayos de Navojoa players
Mexican League baseball left fielders
Mexican League baseball right fielders
Pittsburgh Pirates players
Riverside City Tigers baseball players
Santa Barbara City Vaqueros baseball players
South Georgia Waves players
Sugar Land Skeeters players
Team USA players
Tigres de Quintana Roo players
Vero Beach Dodgers players
21st-century African-American sportspeople
20th-century African-American people